Metarctia lindemannae is a moth of the subfamily Arctiinae. It was described by Sergius G. Kiriakoff in 1961. It is found in Mozambique, Rwanda, Tanzania and Zimbabwe.

References

 

Metarctia
Moths described in 1961